Symon Vasylyovych Petliura (– May 25, 1926) was a Ukrainian politician and journalist. He became the Supreme Commander of the Ukrainian People's Army (UPA) and the President of the Ukrainian People's Republic during Ukraine's short-lived sovereignty in 1918–1921, during the Ukrainian War of Independence and Polish-Soviet War following the fall of the Russian Empire in 1917. 

After the Bolshevik victory in the war, Petliura went into exile. The UPA were responsible for the deaths of tens of thousands of Jewish civilians during the conflict, and Petliura was assassinated in Paris in 1926 by Jewish anarchist Sholem Schwarzbard, who had lost relatives in the pogroms.

Career to 1917 

His father, a Poltava city resident, had owned a transportation business; his mother was a daughter of an Orthodox hieromonk (priest-monk). Petliura obtained his initial education in parochial schools, and planned to become an Orthodox priest.

Petliura studied in the Russian Orthodox Seminary in Poltava from 1895 to 1901. While there he joined the Hromada society in 1898. When his membership in Hromada was discovered in 1901, he was expelled from the seminary. In 1900 Petliura joined the Revolutionary Ukrainian Party (RUP). In 1902, under threat of arrest, he moved to Yekaterinodar in the Kuban, where he worked for two years – initially as a schoolteacher and later as an archivist for the Kuban Cossack Host helping to organize over 200,000 documents. In December 1903 he was arrested for organizing a RUP branch in Yekaterinodar and for publishing inflammatory anti-tsarist articles in the Ukrainian press outside of Imperial Russia (in Austrian-controlled Lemberg in Galicia). Released on bail in March 1904, he moved briefly to Kyiv and then to Lemberg.

In Lviv, Petliura lived under the name of Sviatoslav Tagon, working alongside Ivan Franko and Volodymyr Hnatiuk as an editor for the journal  ("Literary Scientific Herald"), the Shevchenko Scientific Society and as a co-editor of  newspaper. He also contributed numerous articles to the Ukrainian-language press in Galicia.

After Russian censors closed this magazine in July 1905, he moved back to Kyiv where he worked for the newspaper  ("The Council"). In 1907–09 he became the editor of the literary magazine Slovo ("The Word") and co-editor of Ukrayina ("Ukraine").

Because of the closure of these publications by the Russian Imperial authorities, Petliura had once again to move from Kyiv. He went to Moscow in 1909, where he worked briefly as an accountant. There in 1910 he married Olha Bilska (1885–1959), with whom he had a daughter, Lesia (1911–1942). From 1912 until May 1917 he served as a co-editor of the influential Russian-language journal  (Ukrainian Life).

Journalism and publications

As the editor of numerous journals and newspapers, Petliura published over 15,000 critical articles, reviews, stories and poems under an estimated 120 nom-de-plumes. His prolific work in both the Russian and Ukrainian languages helped shape the mindset of the Ukrainian population in the years leading up to the Revolution in both Eastern and Western Ukraine. His prolific correspondence was of great benefit when the Revolution broke out in 1917, as he had contacts throughout Ukraine.

Publications before 1914
As the Ukrainian language had been outlawed in the Russian Empire by the Ems Ukaz of 1876, Petliura found more freedom to publish Ukraine oriented articles in Saint Petersburg than in Ukraine. There, he published the magazine Vilna Ukrayina ("Independent Ukraine") until July 1905. Tsarist censors, however, closed this magazine, and Petliura moved back to Kyiv.

In Kyiv, Petliura first worked for Rada. In 1907 he became editor of the literary magazine Slovo. Also, he co-edited the magazine Ukrayina.

In 1909, these publications were closed by Russian imperial police, and Petliura moved back to Moscow to publish. There, he was co-editor of the Russian-language journal Ukrayinskaya Zhizn to familiarize the local population with news and culture of what was known as Malorossia. He was the chief editor of this publication from 1912 to 1914. In Moscow, he married his wife Olha Bilska in 1915 (later she was also known as her husband under the surname of Marchenko). There, in Moscow was born the daughter of Petliura, Lesia (Olesia).

Publications after emigration
In Paris, Petliura continued the struggle for Ukrainian independence as a publicist. In 1924, Petliura became the editor and publisher of the weekly journal  ("Trident"). He contributed to this journal using various pen names, including V. Marchenko, and V. Salevsky.

Revolution in Ukraine

Rise to power
In May 1917 Petliura attended the First All-Ukrainian Congress of Soldier Deputies held in Kyiv as a delegate. On May 18 he was elected head of the Ukrainian General Military Committee, today seen as the ultimate progenitor of the modern Ukrainian Ministry of Defense. With the proclamation of the Central Council of Ukraine on June 28, 1917, Petliura became the first Secretary (Minister) for Military Affairs.

Disagreeing with the politics of the then chairman of the General Secretariat Volodymyr Vynnychenko, Petliura left the government and became the head of the Haidamaka Kish, a military formation of Sloboda Ukraine (in Kharkiv). In January–February 1918 the Haidamaka Kish was forced back to protect Kyiv during the Uprising at the Kyiv Arsenal Plant and to prevent the capture of the capital by the Bolshevik Red Guard.

After the Hetmanate Putsch (April 28, 1918), the Skoropadsky administration arrested Petliura and incarcerated him for four months in Bila Tserkva.

Petliura participated in the anti-Hetmanate putsch of November 1918 and became a member of the Directorate of Ukraine as the Chief of Military Forces. Following the fall of Kyiv (February 1919) and the emigration of Vynnychenko from Ukraine, Petliura became the leader of the Directorate on 11 February 1919. In his capacity as head of the Army and State, he continued to fight both Bolshevik and White forces in Ukraine for the next ten months.

1919

With the outbreak of hostilities between Ukraine and Soviet Russia in January 1919, and with Vynnychenko's emigration, Petliura ultimately became the leading figure in the Directorate. During the winter of 1919 the Petliura army lost most of Ukraine (including Kyiv) to Bolsheviks and by March 6 relocated to Podolia. In the spring of 1919 he managed to extinguish a coup-d'etat led by Volodymyr Oskilko who saw Petliura cooperating with socialists such as Borys Martos. During the course of the year, Petliura continued to defend the fledgling republic against incursions by the Bolsheviks, Anton Denikin's White Russians, and the Romanian-Polish troops. By autumn of 1919, most of Denikin's White Russian forces were defeated — in the meantime, however, the Bolsheviks had grown to become the dominant force in Ukraine.

1920
On December 5, 1919, Petliura withdrew to Poland, which had previously recognized him as the head of the legal government of Ukraine. In April 1920, as head of the Ukrainian People's Republic, he signed an alliance in Warsaw with the Polish government, agreeing to a border on the River Zbruch and recognizing Poland's right to Galicia in exchange for military aid in overthrowing the Bolshevik régime. Polish forces, reinforced by Petliura's remaining troops (some two divisions), attacked Kyiv on May 7, 1920, in what proved a turning point of the 1919–21 Polish-Bolshevik war. Following initial successes, Piłsudski's and Petliura's forces had to retreat to the Vistula River and to the Polish capital, Warsaw. The Polish Army defeated the Bolshevik Russians in the end, but the Red Army remained in parts of Ukraine and therefore Ukrainians were unable to secure their independence. Petliura directed the affairs of the Ukrainian government-in-exile from Tarnów in Lesser Poland, and when the Soviet government in Moscow requested Petliura's extradition from Poland, the Poles engineered his "disappearance", secretly moving him from Tarnów to Warsaw.

After the revolution
Bolshevik Russia persistently demanded that Petliura be handed over. Protected by several Polish friends and colleagues, such as Henryk Józewski, with the establishment of the Soviet Union on December 30, 1922, Petliura, in late 1923 left Poland for Budapest, then Vienna, Geneva and finally settled in Paris in early 1924. Here he established and edited the Ukrainian-language newspaper Tryzub.

Promoting a Ukrainian cultural identity
During his time as leader of the Directorate, Petliura was active in supporting Ukrainian culture both in Ukraine and in the Ukrainian diaspora.

Supporting culture in Ukraine
Petliura introduced the awarding of the title "People's Artist of Ukraine" to artists who had made significant contributions to Ukrainian culture. A similar titled award was continued after a significant break under the Soviet regime. Among those who had received this award was blind kobza player Ivan Kuchuhura-Kucherenko.

Promoting Ukrainian culture abroad
He also saw the value in gaining international support and recognition of Ukrainian arts through cultural exchanges. Most notably, Petliura actively supported the work of cultural leaders such as the choreographer Vasyl Avramenko, conductor Oleksander Koshetz and bandurist Vasyl Yemetz, to allow them to travel internationally and promote an awareness of Ukrainian culture. Koshetz created the Ukrainian Republic Capella and took it on tour internationally, giving concerts in Europe and the Americas. One of the concerts by the Capella inspired George Gershwin to write "Summertime", based on the lullaby "Oi Khodyt Son Kolo Vikon" All three musicians later emigrated to the United States.

Life in exile
In Paris, Petliura directed the activities of the government of the Ukrainian National Republic in exile. He launched the weekly Tryzub, and continued to edit and write numerous articles under various pen names with an emphasis on questions dealing with national oppression in Ukraine. These articles were written with a literary flair. The question of national awareness was often of significance in his literary work.

Petliura's articles had a significant impact on the shaping of Ukrainian national awareness in the early 20th century. He published articles and brochures under a variety of noms de plume, including V. Marchenko, V. Salevsky, I. Rokytsky, and O. Riastr.

Role in pogroms

Petliura is considered a controversial figure connected with the pogroms of Jews during his rule of the Ukrainian National Republic. According to Peter Kenez, "before the advent of Hitler, the greatest mass murder of Jews occurs in Ukraine in the course of the Civil War. All participants in the conflict were guilty of murdering Jews, even the Bolsheviks; however the Volunteer Army had the largest number of victims." The number of Jews killed during the period is estimated to be between 50,000 and 200,000. A total of 1,236 violent attacks on Jews had been recorded between 1918 and 1921 in Ukraine. Among them, 493 were carried out by Ukrainian People's Republic soldiers under the command of Symon Petliura, 307 by independent Ukrainian warlords, 213 by Denikin's army, 106 by the Red Army, and 32 by the Polish Army.

The newly formed Ukrainian state (Ukrainian People's Republic) promised Jews full equality and autonomy. Arnold Margolin, a Jewish assistant minister in Petliura's UPR government, declared in May 1919 that the Ukrainian government had given Jews more rights than they enjoyed in any other European government. However, after 1918, military units became involved in pogroms against Jews. During Petliura's term as Head of State (1919–20), pogroms continued to be perpetrated on Ukrainian territory.

Petliura's role in the pogroms has been a topic of dispute since his assassination in 1926 and the succeeding Schwartzbard's trial. In 1969, the journal Jewish Social Studies published two opposing views regarding Petliura's responsibility in pogroms against Jews during his reign over Ukraine, by scholars Taras Hunczak and Zosa Szajkowski. Later the Journal published letters from the two authors.

According to Hunczak, Petliura actively sought to halt anti-Jewish violence on numerous occasions, introducing capital punishment for carrying out pogroms. Conversely, he is also accused of not having done enough to stop the pogroms and being afraid to punish officers and soldiers engaged in crimes against Jews for fear of losing their support.

Assassination

On May 25, 1926, at 14:12, by the Gibert bookstore, Petliura was walking on Rue Racine near Boulevard Saint-Michel of the Latin Quarter in Paris and was approached by Sholom Schwartzbard. Schwartzbard asked him in Ukrainian, "Are you Mr. Petliura?" Petliura did not answer but raised his walking cane. Schwartzbard pulled out a gun, proclaimed "dirty dog, killer of my people, defend yourself!" and shot him five times. Evading a lynch-mob attempting to avenge Petliura, Schwartzbard gave himself into the police with a note reading: "I have killed Petliura to avenge the death of the thousands of pogrom victims in Ukraine who were massacred by Petliura's forces without his taking any steps to prevent these massacres." The Jewish Daily Bulletin reported that Petliura was responsible for killing over 30,000 Jews.

Schwartzbard was an anarchist of Jewish descent, born in Ukraine. He participated in the Jewish self-defense of Balta in 1905. The Russian Tsarist government sentenced him to 3 months in prison for "provoking" the Balta pogrom. He was twice convicted of taking part in anarchist "expropriation" (burglary) and bank robbery in Austria-Hungary. He later joined the French Foreign Legion (1914–1917) and was wounded in the Battle of the Somme. It is reported that Schwartzbard told famous fellow anarchist leader Nestor Makhno in Paris that he was terminally ill and expected to die and that he would take Petliura with him; Makhno forbade Schwartzbard to do so.

Schwartzbard's parents were among fifteen members of his family murdered in the pogroms in Odessa. The core defense at the Schwartzbard trial was — as presented by the noted jurist Henri Torres — that he was avenging the deaths of more than 50,000 Jewish victims of the pogroms, whereas the prosecution (both criminal and civil) tried to show that Petliura was not responsible for the pogroms and that Schwartzbard was a Soviet agent. After a trial lasting eight days the jury acquitted Schwartzbard.

According to a defected KGB operative Peter Deriabin, Schwartzbard was a Soviet (NKVD) agent and acted on the order from a former chairman of the Soviet Ukrainian government and current Soviet Ambassador to France, Christian Rakovsky. The special operation of the GPU was consolidated by GPU agent Mikhail Volodin, who arrived in France August 8, 1925, and who had been in close contact with Schwartzbard.

Petliura was buried alongside his wife and daughter in the Cimetière du Montparnasse in Paris.

Petliura's two sisters, Orthodox nuns who had remained in Poltava, were arrested and shot in 1928 by the NKVD (the Soviet secret police). It is claimed that in March 1926, Vlas Chubar (Chairman of the Council of People's Commissars of Ukraine), in a speech given in Kharkiv and repeated in Moscow, warned of the danger Petliura represented to Soviet power. It was after this speech that the command had allegedly been given to assassinate Petliura.

Legacy

Ukraine

With the dissolution of the Soviet Union in 1991, previously restricted Soviet archives have allowed numerous politicians and historians to review Petliura's role in Ukrainian history. Some consider him a national hero who strove for the independence of Ukraine. Several cities, including Kyiv, the Ukrainian capital and Poltava, the city of his birth, have erected monuments to Petliura, with a museum complex also being planned in Poltava. Petliura's statue, unveiled in Vinnytsia in October 2017, was denounced as disgraceful and deplorable by the World Jewish Congress. To mark the 80th anniversary of his assassination, a twelve-volume edition of his writings, including articles, letters and historic documents, has been published in Kyiv by Taras Shevchenko University and the State Archive of Ukraine. In 1992 in Poltava, a series of readings known as "Petlurivski chytannia" have become an annual event, and since 1993, they take place annually at Kyiv University.

In June 2009, the Kyiv City Council renamed Comintern Street (located in the Shevchenkivskyi District) into  to commemorate the occasion of his 130th birthday anniversary.

In current Ukraine Petliura has not been as lionized as Mykhailo Hrushevsky (who played a much smaller role in the Ukrainian People's Republic) since Petliura was too closely associated with violence to make a good symbolic figure. In a 2008 poll of "Famous Ukrainians of all times" (in which respondents did not receive any lists or tips) Petliura was not mentioned (Hrushevsky came in sixth place in this poll). In the 2008 TV project Velyki Ukraïntsi ("Greatest Ukrainians") he placed 26th.

A nephew of Symon Petliura, Stepan Skrypnyk became the Patriarch Mstyslav of the Ukrainian Orthodox Church on 6 June 1990.

In December 2022 recently liberated (from Russian forces) Izium decided  to rename Maxim Gorky Street to Symon Petliura Street.

Ukrainian diaspora
For part of the Western Ukrainian diaspora, Petliura is remembered as a national hero, a fighter for Ukrainian independence, a martyr, who inspired hundreds of thousands to fight for an independent Ukrainian state. He has inspired original music, and youth organizations.

Petliura in Ukrainian folk songs
During the revolution Petliura became the subject of numerous folk songs, primarily as a hero calling for his people to unite against foreign oppression. His name became synonymous with the call for freedom. 15 songs were recorded by the ethnographer rev. prof. K. Danylevsky. In the songs Petliura is depicted as a soldier, in a manner similar to Robin Hood, mocking Skoropadsky and the Bolshevik Red Guard.

News of Petliura's assassination in the summer of 1926 was marked by numerous revolts in eastern Ukraine particularly in Boromlia, Zhehailivtsi, (Sumy province), Velyka Rublivka, Myloradov (Poltava province), Hnylsk, Bilsk, Kuzemyn and all along the Vorskla River from Okhtyrka to Poltava, Burynia, Nizhyn (Chernihiv province) and other cities. These revolts were brutally pacified by the Soviet administration. The blind kobzars Pavlo Hashchenko and Ivan Kuchuhura Kucherenko composed a duma (epic poem) in memory of Symon Petliura. To date Petliura is the only modern Ukrainian politician to have a duma created and sung in his memory. This duma became popular among the kobzars of left-bank Ukraine and was sung also by Stepan Pasiuha, Petro Drevchenko, Bohushchenko, and Chumak.

The Soviets also tried their hand at portraying Petliura through the arts in order to discredit the Ukrainian national leader. A number of humorous songs appeared in which Petliura is portrayed as a traveling beggar whose only territory is that which is under his train carriage. A number of plays such as The Republic on Wheels by Yakov Mamontov and the opera Shchors by Boris Liatoshinsky and Arsenal by Georgy Maiboroda portray Petliura in a negative light, as a lackey who sold out Western Ukraine to Poland, often using the very same melodies which had become popular during the fight for Ukrainian Independence in 1918.

Petliura continues to be portrayed by the Ukrainian people in its folk songs in a manner similar to Taras Shevchenko and Bohdan Khmelnytsky. He is likened to the sun which suddenly stopped shining.

See also

 List of national leaders of Ukraine
 Ukrainian Civil War
 Anton Denikin

Notes

References

Bibliography

 Danylevskyi/Danylevsky, Rev. Prof. K. (1947). Petliura v sertsiakh i pisniakh svoho narodu. Regensburg: Nakladom filii Tovarystva ukrayinskykh politychnykh v’iazniv v Regensburzi. P. 11.
 Danylevskyi/Danylevsky, Rev. Prof. K. O. (1951). Petliura v sertsiakh i pisniakh svoho narodu. Pittsburgh, USA: Vidbytka z Narodnoho Slova. P. 24.
 Encyclopedia of Ukraine – Paris-New York 1970, Volume 6, pp. 2029–30.
 
 Schwartzbard, Sholom: Over The Years (Inem Loif Fun Yoren). Excerpt from a book by Petliura's assassin explaining his actions.

External links

English
  Symon Petliura, Yevhen Konovalets, Stepan Bandera - Three Leaders of Ukrainian Liberation Movement murdered by the Order of Moscow (audiobook).
Biography of Petliura on website of the Ukrainian government
Petliura site in Poltava (Documents, articles and photographs)
 (Time magazine on the Petlura trial)
Turning the pages back...May 25, 1926 (Ukrainian Weekly account of shooting of Petliura)
Review of books on Petliura
Review of Henry Abramson's A Prayer for the Government: Ukrainians and Jews in Revolutionary Times
The Odyssey of the Petliura Library and the Records of the Ukrainian National Republic during World War II

Non-English
"Symon Petliura. Facts against myths" by Alik Gomelsky.
"Unknown Symon Petliura: history of an interview," Zerkalo Nedeli (Mirror Weekly), July 7–13, 2001. Available online in Russian and in Ukrainian.
"A Belated Idealist," Zerkalo Nedeli (Mirror Weekly), May 22–28, 2004. Available online in Russian and in Ukrainian.
"Symon Petliura as opponent of Jewish pogroms," Zerkalo Nedeli (Mirror Weekly), July 25–31, 1996. Available online in Russian.
Article published in the "Archives of the Ukrainian Security Service" on Petlura and the GPU re his assassination based on recently discovered materials from the vaults of the Ukrainian Security Service in Ukrainian.
Symon Petliura in opposition to Jewish Pogroms (in Russian)
Petliura web site in Poltava Web site of documents pertaining to Symon Petliura in Ukrainian, Russian and English.
 

1879 births
1926 deaths
Assassinated Ukrainian politicians
Burials at Montparnasse Cemetery
Deaths by firearm in France
1926 murders in France
1920s murders in Paris
Defence ministers of Ukraine
Heads of state of Ukraine
Members of the Central Council of Ukraine
Members of the Shevchenko Scientific Society
Writers from Poltava
People from Poltava Governorate
People murdered in Paris
People of the Polish–Soviet War
Revolutionary Ukrainian Party politicians
Russian Constituent Assembly members
Society of Ukrainian Progressors members
Ukrainian accountants
Ukrainian anti-communists
Ukrainian emigrants to France
Ukrainian generals
Ukrainian nationalists
Ukrainian people in the Russian Empire
Ukrainian people murdered abroad
Ukrainian people of the Ukrainian–Soviet War
Ukrainian refugees
Ukrainian revolutionaries
Ukrainian Social Democratic Labour Party politicians
Ukrainian independence activists
Antisemitism in Ukraine
People killed in Soviet intelligence operations
Politicians from Poltava